Pauline Johnson is an English immunologist and microbiologist at the University of British Columbia. Her research focuses on innate and adaptive immune mechanisms — in particular, the mobility of proteins in membranes, lymphocyte cell surface molecules, T cell signalling, leukocyte adhesion, and macrophages in lung inflammation.

Education
Pauline Johnson was born in Yorkshire, England. She earned a BSc in biochemistry from Liverpool University in 1980, and a Ph.D from the University of Dundee in 1983. Her Ph.D. project was to determine the lateral and rotational mobility of membrane components measured by fluorescence recovery after photobleaching and fluorescence depletion recovery.

She was a post-doctoral fellow at the Salk Institute in California, US under the supervision of  Ian Trowbridge  and at the MRC Cellular Immunology Unit at the University of Oxford, U.K. under the supervision of  Alan F. Williams before joining the faculty at the University of British Columbia in 1991.

Career and research
Johnson helped to establish the function of CD45 as a critical protein tyrosine phosphatase in T cell activation

and defined the mechanisms regulating the interactions of the cell adhesion molecule CD44 with the matrix component, hyaluronan.

Her research in 2020 uses mouse models of lung disease to study the function of macrophages and the cell matrix in infection, inflammation, and cancer.

She held an MRC Scientist Award and was Co-Director of the Infection, Inflammation and Immunity Research Group at the Life Science Institute at UBC (2003-2009). She has served multiple times on the CIHR Immunology and Transplantation panel, including as Scientific Officer, as well as on other national and international review panels. She is a member of the CIHR III Institute Advisory Board (III institute = Inflammation, infection and immunity CIHR Institute).

Awards 
 MRC Scientist Award, MRC of Canada, 1999-2004
 Women in Science Award for Community Leadership and Scientific Excellence, Minerva Foundation for B.C. Women, 2013

Publications

References

External links
 Johnson Lab
 

Year of birth missing (living people)
Living people
Scientists from Yorkshire
Women immunologists
Alumni of the University of Liverpool
Alumni of the University of Dundee
20th-century English scientists
20th-century British women scientists
21st-century English scientists
21st-century British women scientists
English women biologists
English microbiologists
Women microbiologists
20th-century British biologists
21st-century British biologists
English expatriates in Canada
British expatriate academics in Canada
British immunologists
Academic staff of the University of British Columbia
20th-century English women
20th-century English people
21st-century English women